Moscow City Duma District 6 is one of 45 constituencies in Moscow City Duma. The constituency has covered parts of Northern Moscow since 2014. From 1993-2005 District 6 also was based in Northern Moscow, but it covered parts to the south of its current configuration; from 2005-2014 the constituency was based in Eastern Moscow (it actually overlapped the entirety of State Duma Preobrazhensky constituency in 2005-2009).

Members elected

Election results

2001

|-
! colspan=2 style="background-color:#E9E9E9;text-align:left;vertical-align:top;" |Candidate
! style="background-color:#E9E9E9;text-align:left;vertical-align:top;" |Party
! style="background-color:#E9E9E9;text-align:right;" |Votes
! style="background-color:#E9E9E9;text-align:right;" |%
|-
|style="background-color:#1042A5"|
|align=left|Irina Rukina (incumbent)
|align=left|Union of Right Forces
|
|33.67%
|-
|style="background-color:"|
|align=left|Aleksandr Andreyev
|align=left|Independent
|
|23.06%
|-
|style="background-color:"|
|align=left|Yury Kotov
|align=left|Communist Party
|
|14.76%
|-
|style="background-color:"|
|align=left|Vladimir Yatsenko
|align=left|Independent
|
|10.78%
|-
|style="background-color:"|
|align=left|Shamun Kagermanov
|align=left|Independent
|
|1.83%
|-
|style="background-color:#000000"|
|colspan=2 |against all
|
|10.98%
|-
| colspan="5" style="background-color:#E9E9E9;"|
|- style="font-weight:bold"
| colspan="3" style="text-align:left;" | Total
| 
| 100%
|-
| colspan="5" style="background-color:#E9E9E9;"|
|- style="font-weight:bold"
| colspan="4" |Source:
|
|}

2005

|-
! colspan=2 style="background-color:#E9E9E9;text-align:left;vertical-align:top;" |Candidate
! style="background-color:#E9E9E9;text-align:left;vertical-align:top;" |Party
! style="background-color:#E9E9E9;text-align:right;" |Votes
! style="background-color:#E9E9E9;text-align:right;" |%
|-
|style="background-color:"|
|align=left|Andrey Metelsky (incumbent)
|align=left|United Russia
|
|46.02%
|-
|style="background-color:"|
|align=left|Valentina Prisyazhnyuk (incumbent)
|align=left|Independent
|
|23.89%
|-
|style="background-color:"|
|align=left|Dmitry Shchavelev
|align=left|Russian Party of Life
|
|8.41%
|-
|style="background-color:"|
|align=left|Kirill Prokofyev
|align=left|Liberal Democratic Party
|
|5.77%
|-
|style="background-color:"|
|align=left|Vladislav Paramzin
|align=left|Independent
|
|4.82%
|-
| colspan="5" style="background-color:#E9E9E9;"|
|- style="font-weight:bold"
| colspan="3" style="text-align:left;" | Total
| 
| 100%
|-
| colspan="5" style="background-color:#E9E9E9;"|
|- style="font-weight:bold"
| colspan="4" |Source:
|
|}

2009

|-
! colspan=2 style="background-color:#E9E9E9;text-align:left;vertical-align:top;" |Candidate
! style="background-color:#E9E9E9;text-align:left;vertical-align:top;" |Party
! style="background-color:#E9E9E9;text-align:right;" |Votes
! style="background-color:#E9E9E9;text-align:right;" |%
|-
|style="background-color:"|
|align=left|Andrey Metelsky (incumbent)
|align=left|United Russia
|
|64.26%
|-
|style="background-color:"|
|align=left|Vladimir Koshelev
|align=left|Communist Party
|
|16.09%
|-
|style="background-color:"|
|align=left|Miras Tulepov
|align=left|A Just Russia
|
|5.70%
|-
|style="background-color:"|
|align=left|Kirill Strebkov
|align=left|Liberal Democratic Party
|
|5.44%
|-
|style="background-color:"|
|align=left|Oleg Alekseyev
|align=left|Independent
|
|4.81%
|-
| colspan="5" style="background-color:#E9E9E9;"|
|- style="font-weight:bold"
| colspan="3" style="text-align:left;" | Total
| 
| 100%
|-
| colspan="5" style="background-color:#E9E9E9;"|
|- style="font-weight:bold"
| colspan="4" |Source:
|
|}

2014

|-
! colspan=2 style="background-color:#E9E9E9;text-align:left;vertical-align:top;" |Candidate
! style="background-color:#E9E9E9;text-align:left;vertical-align:top;" |Party
! style="background-color:#E9E9E9;text-align:right;" |Votes
! style="background-color:#E9E9E9;text-align:right;" |%
|-
|style="background-color:"|
|align=left|Nadezhda Babkina
|align=left|United Russia
|
|36.91%
|-
|style="background-color:"|
|align=left|Sergey Grigorov
|align=left|Yabloko
|
|23.93%
|-
|style="background-color:"|
|align=left|Boris Yeliseyev
|align=left|A Just Russia
|
|16.38%
|-
|style="background-color:"|
|align=left|Nadezhda Barynina
|align=left|Communist Party
|
|14.77%
|-
|style="background-color:"|
|align=left|Tamara Lopareva
|align=left|Liberal Democratic Party
|
|4.57%
|-
| colspan="5" style="background-color:#E9E9E9;"|
|- style="font-weight:bold"
| colspan="3" style="text-align:left;" | Total
| 
| 100%
|-
| colspan="5" style="background-color:#E9E9E9;"|
|- style="font-weight:bold"
| colspan="4" |Source:
|
|}

2019

|-
! colspan=2 style="background-color:#E9E9E9;text-align:left;vertical-align:top;" |Candidate
! style="background-color:#E9E9E9;text-align:left;vertical-align:top;" |Party
! style="background-color:#E9E9E9;text-align:right;" |Votes
! style="background-color:#E9E9E9;text-align:right;" |%
|-
|style="background-color:"|
|align=left|Yevgeny Bunimovich
|align=left|Yabloko
|
|40.56%
|-
|style="background-color:"|
|align=left|Mikhail Balykhin
|align=left|Independent
|
|27.75%
|-
|style="background-color:"|
|align=left|Aleksey Melnikov
|align=left|Communist Party
|
|16.78%
|-
|style="background-color:"|
|align=left|Natalya Krutskikh
|align=left|Communists of Russia
|
|6.05%
|-
|style="background-color:"|
|align=left|Aleksey Pochernin
|align=left|Liberal Democratic Party
|
|5.67%
|-
| colspan="5" style="background-color:#E9E9E9;"|
|- style="font-weight:bold"
| colspan="3" style="text-align:left;" | Total
| 
| 100%
|-
| colspan="5" style="background-color:#E9E9E9;"|
|- style="font-weight:bold"
| colspan="4" |Source:
|
|}

Notes

References

Moscow City Duma districts